Poovanam is a village in the Pattukkottai taluk of Thanjavur district, Tamil Nadu, India. It is located in the southern part of the district. It is a peaceful village situated in the Cauvery delta.
East area of Poovanam is called Keezhapoovanamand west side area called as Melapoovanam.

Etymology 

The name Poovanam literally means "FlowerRocket (firework)" in Tamil, the local language.

Geography 
It is situated in the Cauvery delta along the southeast coast of India in the East-central region of Tamil Nadu. Poovanam is  12 kilometers from Pattukkottai and at distance of 60 kilometers from Thanjavur. North side of Poovanam covered by the River, which is called as Agniyaru().

Demographics 

As per the 2001 census, Poovanam had a total population of 1582 with 761 males and 821 females. The sex ratio was 1079. The literacy rate was 63.31.

Economy 

Poovanam's economy is mainly agro-based. Agriculture in Poovanam is the main source of livelihood for most of its people. Agricultural Cultivation has been the major occupation of the local inhabitants of Poovanam as the land is ideal for growing crops like Rice and cultivation of Coconut palm tree's. The maximum portion of Poovanam land is used up for cultivation and agriculture. It is Cauvery Delta area. there are four pond's situated near agricultural area's.

Temples 
 Sri Panjaiyappan temple
 Sri kaliyamman temple
 Aakasa mariamman kovil )yadhava street(
 Sri vijaya vinayagar kovil (yadhava street)
 Sri siththi vinayagar() Temple.
 Ayyanar Temple.
 Pushpa bhuvaneshwararTemple, placed near Agniyaru.
 Sri Panjayappan kovil near agni river

Churches 

 St.Francise Xavier Roman Catholic church.

Schools 

 Panchayat Union Primary School, Keezhapoovanam.
 Panchayat Union Primary School, Melapoovanam.

References 

 
 

Villages in Thanjavur district